Gianmatteo Matteotti (17 February 1921 – 14 June 2000), also known as Matteo Matteotti, was an Italian socialist politician. He held several cabinet posts in the 1970s.

Early life
Matteotti was born in Rome on 17 February 1921. He was the second son of Giacomo Matteotti and had an older brother, Giancarlo.

Career and activities
After 8 September 1943 Matteotti participated in the War of Liberation and was a militant of the Red Flag movement.

He later joined the Italian Socialist Party (PSI) and served as its secretary, until 1946. The same year he was elected deputy to the Constituent Assembly. In 1947 he became a member of the Italian Democratic Socialist Party (PSDI) and was elected to the Chamber in 1948 for the party. In the mid-1950s he was the general secretary of the party. In 1959 Matteotti rejoined the PSI. In 1968 he left the party and rejoined the PSDI. 

He was appointed minister of tourism and entertainment to the cabinet led by Prime Minister Emilio Colombo in 1970. Then he was appointed minister of foreign trade to the cabinet of Giulio Andreotti in 1973. Matteotti also held the same post in the subsequent cabinet headed by Mariano Rumor from 1973 to 1974.

Death
Matteotti died in Verona on 14 June 2000. Like his father and his older brother Giancarlo (died 2006) he was buried in Fratta Polesine.

References

External links

20th-century Italian journalists
1921 births
2000 deaths
Italian Democratic Socialist Party politicians
Government ministers of Italy
Members of the National Council (Italy)
Children of national leaders
Italian Socialist Party politicians
Politicians from Rome